Newport, Vermont may refer to:

Newport (town), Vermont
Newport (city), Vermont